Florian M. Pilkington-Miksa (3 June 1950 – 20 May 2021) was an English rock drummer and a sculptor. He was best known as a member of both the original and reformed lineups of Curved Air. He also performed with Kiki Dee. 

Pilkington-Miksa died in May 2021 after several bouts of pneumonia, at the age of 70.

References

1950 births
2021 deaths
Curved Air members
English rock drummers
People educated at Eton College
People from Paddington